Carlos Manuel Insaurralde (born 31 January 1999) is an Argentine professional footballer who plays as a central midfielder for Gimnasia La Plata, on loan from San Lorenzo.

Club career
Insaurralde spent his opening youth years with local team Internacionale de Obrero from 2005, prior to joining Boca Unidos' system in 2014. In 2015, following an unsuccessful trial with River Plate, Insaurralde joined San Lorenzo. He was promoted into the club's senior squad three years later, when he was selected for his professional debut on 22 October 2018 against San Martín; featuring for seventy-six minutes of a 2–1 victory. 

After eleven appearances, Insaurralde left on loan in January 2020 to Ecuadorian Serie A side Universidad Católica until the end of the year. He participated in twenty-three matches during the 2020 campaign, which included a Copa Sudamericana bow on 12 February against Lanús. 

In July 2021, Insaurralde once again left on loan, this time to Gimnasia La Plata on a deal until the end of 2022, with a purchase option for 50% of his card.

International career
In December 2018, Insaurralde was selected by Argentina for the 2019 South American U-20 Championship in Chile. He featured four times as they lost in the final to Ecuador.

Career statistics
.

References

External links

1999 births
Living people
People from Formosa, Argentina
Argentine footballers
Argentine expatriate footballers
Argentina youth international footballers
Argentina under-20 international footballers
Association football midfielders
San Lorenzo de Almagro footballers
C.D. Universidad Católica del Ecuador footballers
Club de Gimnasia y Esgrima La Plata footballers
Argentine Primera División players
Ecuadorian Serie A players
Argentine expatriate sportspeople in Ecuador
Expatriate footballers in Ecuador